The 1985 Air Canada Cup was Canada's seventh annual national midget 'AAA' hockey championship, which was played April 16 – 20, 1985 at the Regina Agridome in Regina, Saskatchewan.  The Lions du Lac St-Louis from Quebec won their second national title, defeating the host Regina Pat Canadians in the gold medal game.  The Calgary Buffaloes won the bronze medal.
  Future National Hockey League players playing in this tournament were Benoit Brunet,  Dean Chynoweth, Kevin Dahl, Claude Lapointe, Don MacLean, Lyle Odelein, Cam Russell, and Peter White.

Teams

Round robin

Standings

Scores

Calgary 4 - Regina 1
Toronto 4 - Thunder Bay 1
Lac St-Louis 7 - Dartmouth 4
Regina 4 - Toronto 2
Lac St-Louis 5 - Thunder Bay 1
Dartmouth 5 - Toronto 5
Lac St-Louis 7 - Calgary 2
Regina 10 - Dartmouth 3
Calgary 11 - Thunder Bay 2
Regina 7 - Lac St-Louis 3
Calgary 2 - Toronto 2
Dartmouth 7 - Thunder Bay 3
Lac St-Louis 6 - Toronto 1
Regina 2 - Thunder Bay 0
Dartmouth 5 - Calgary 1

Playoffs

Semi-finals
Regina 5 - Calgary 1
Lac St-Louis 5 - Dartmouth 4 (2OT)

Bronze-medal game
Calgary 4 - Dartmouth 1

Gold-medal game
Lac St-Louis 5 - Regina 2

Individual awards
Most Valuable Player: Craig Suchan (Regina)
Top Scorer: Hal Turner (Dartmouth), Colin Power (Dartmouth)
Top Forward: Claude Lapointe (Lac St-Louis)
Top Defenceman: Shawn Anderson (Lac St-Louis)
Top Goaltender: Craig Suchan (Regina)
Most Sportsmanlike Player: Bryan Bosch (Calgary)

See also
Telus Cup

References

External links
Telus Cup Website
Hockey Canada-Telus Cup Guide and Record Book

Telus Cup
Air Canada Cup
Sports competitions in Regina, Saskatchewan
Ice hockey competitions in Saskatchewan
Air Canada Cup
Air Canada Cup